Conus kostini is a species of sea snail, a marine gastropod mollusc in the family Conidae, the cone snails, cone shells or cones.

These snails are predatory and venomous. They are capable of "stinging" humans.

Description
The size of the shell varies between 60 mm and 100 mm.

Distribution
This marine species occurs off Balut Island, Southern Mindanao, the Philippines

References

 Filmer R.M., Monteiro A., Lorenz F. & Verdasca A. (2012) A new species of Conidae (Gastropoda) from the Philippines. Acta Conchyliorum 11: 37-43.
 Puillandre N., Duda T.F., Meyer C., Olivera B.M. & Bouchet P. (2015). One, four or 100 genera? A new classification of the cone snails. Journal of Molluscan Studies. 81: 1-23

External links
 To World Register of Marine Species
 Cone Shells - Knights of the Sea
 
 Holotype in MNHN, Paris

kostini
Gastropods described in 2012